Yuriy Andryushin (Ukrainian: Юрій Андрюшин) is a paralympic swimmer from Ukraine competing mainly in category S7 events.

Yuriy has competed at three Paralympics for the Ukrainian Paralympic swimming team winning a single medal each time.  His first games in 1996 led to a bronze in the 100m freestyle, he also competed in the 50m freestyle finishing sixth and 400m freestyle where he failed to make the final. At the 2000 Summer Paralympics in Sydney he competed in the 50m and 100m freestyle finishing fifth in both but it was in the 50m butterfly where he won a gold medal in a new world-record time.  In his third games in 2004 he could only manage a bronze in the 50m butterfly  but also competed in the 100m freestyle where he was disqualified in his heat, finished eighth in the 200m medley, the 50m freestyle where he finished sixth and was part of the Ukrainian teams in the 4 × 100 m freestyle that failed to make the final and the 4 × 100 m medley that finished sixth.

References

External links
 

Living people
Ukrainian male butterfly swimmers
Paralympic swimmers of Ukraine
Paralympic gold medalists for Ukraine
Paralympic bronze medalists for Ukraine
Paralympic medalists in swimming
Swimmers at the 1996 Summer Paralympics
Swimmers at the 2000 Summer Paralympics
Swimmers at the 2004 Summer Paralympics
Medalists at the 1996 Summer Paralympics
Medalists at the 2000 Summer Paralympics
Medalists at the 2004 Summer Paralympics
Year of birth missing (living people)
Place of birth missing (living people)
Recipients of the Honorary Diploma of the Cabinet of Ministers of Ukraine
Ukrainian male freestyle swimmers
S7-classified Paralympic swimmers
Medalists at the World Para Swimming Championships
20th-century Ukrainian people
21st-century Ukrainian people